Acosmerycoides is a monotypic moth genus in the family Sphingidae described by Rudolf Mell in 1922. Its only species, Acosmerycoides harterti or Hartert's hawkmoth, was described by Walter Rothschild in 1895.

Distribution 
It is found from Assam in India, eastwards across southern China to Taiwan and south to Thailand, Laos and Vietnam.

Description 
The wingspan is 80–90 mm.

Biology 
The larvae feed on Vitis species.

References

Macroglossini
Monotypic moth genera
Moths of Asia